Possums is a 1998 sports comedy film directed by Max Burnett.

Plot
When a small town votes to disband the local football team, the Possums, a radio announcer begins announcing imaginary radio games which the Possums win causing the real state champs to challenge the Possums to a game.

Cast
 Mac Davis - Wilbur "Will" Clark
 Greg Coolidge - Jake Malloy
 Cynthia Sikes - Elizabeth Clark
 Andrew Prine - Mayor Charlie Lawton
 Dennis Burkley - Orville Moss
 Monica Creel - Sarah Jacobs
 Jay Underwood - John Clark
 Barry Switzer - Prattville Pirates Coach

References

External links 
 

American football films
1998 films
Films scored by Justin Burnett
1990s English-language films
1990s American films